WWF SmackDown! 2: Know Your Role, known in Japan as , is a professional wrestling video game developed by Yuke's released in November 2000 on the PlayStation by THQ. It is the sequel to WWF SmackDown!, and the second game in the SmackDown series, itself based on the World Wrestling Federation (WWF, now WWE) professional wrestling promotion.  

Know Your Role achieved commercial success, becoming the best-selling combat sports game on a single format (PlayStation) with 3.2 million units sold. The game would be succeeded by WWF SmackDown! Just Bring It the following year in November 2001.

Gameplay
The Season Mode was heavily modified in this game. Along with removing the pre-season mode that was included in the original, Know Your Role gave more storylines and more matches per show. These changes were given a mixed reaction by fans and critics alike. Wrestlers, wrestling moves, and arenas are unlocked as the player progresses through a season. The Season Mode has multiplayer support, with up to four players playing at once in a Season. Wrestlers such as Shawn Michaels, Stone Cold Steve Austin, Billy Gunn, Mick Foley (including Cactus Jack) and Debra are unlockable characters.

This is also Michael Cole's second appearance as an unlockable character, with his first appearance being in WWF No Mercy. This would be Cole's last appearance as a playable character until WWE '12, where he was included as DLC.

Big Show and Ken Shamrock were initially playable in the game; however, they were both removed before release. Big Show had been removed from the promotion's main roster and was sent to Ohio Valley Wrestling, while Shamrock left professional wrestling to return to mixed martial arts competition. Despite this, both characters have been known to randomly appear during a Royal Rumble match (which the player can take control of) and can be used in other modes via a GameShark code, although their names and select screen images were removed.

Create modes
WWF SmackDown! 2: Know Your Role was the first game in the SmackDown series which introduced the advanced Create-A-Superstar, allowing the player to create a character in greater detail as opposed to just choosing preset mix-and-match templates like the previous game. A unique feature was also included in which players are allowed to assign managers such as Paul Bearer and Tori to different superstars. In addition, more features were added such as Create-A-Moveset, Create-A-Taunt, and Create-A-Stable which allowed up to 4 members.

Reception

The game received "universal acclaim" according to video game review aggregator Metacritic.  At a score of 90 out of 100, Metacritic has never awarded a higher score to any other WWE video game. Daniel Erickson of NextGen said, "There are tons of options and great multiplayer matches, but Smackdowns Story mode falls on its candy ass." In Japan, Famitsu gave it a score of 30 out of 40.

The game received a "Platinum" sales award from the Entertainment and Leisure Software Publishers Association (ELSPA), indicating sales of at least 300,000 units in the UK.

The game was nominated for the "Best Sports Game (Alternative)" award at GameSpots Best and Worst of 2000 Awards, which went to Tony Hawk's Pro Skater 2. It was also a runner-up for the "Best Extreme Sports Game" and "Best Multiplayer Game" awards at the Official U.S. PlayStation Magazine 2000 Editors' Awards, both of which went to SSX and TimeSplitters. The game won the award for Action in Readers' Choice at IGNs Best of 2000 Awards.

Notes

References

External links

2000 video games
Multiplayer and single-player video games
PlayStation (console) games
PlayStation (console)-only games
Professional wrestling games
Video games developed in Japan
WWE SmackDown video games
WWE video games
THQ games
Yuke's games